Kasemjan (also Romanized as Kasemjān; also known as Gasamjān, Kasbehjān-e Pā’īn, and Kasmehjān) is a village in Kuhestani-ye Talesh Rural District, in the Central District of Talesh County, Gilan Province, Iran. At the 2006 census, its population was 352, in 88 families.

References 

Populated places in Talesh County